Funes is a town and municipality located in the province and autonomous community of Navarre, northern Spain. It is situated 62 kilometers from the capital of the community, Pamplona. Its population in 2017 was 2482 inhabitants.

References

External links
 FUNES in the Bernardo Estornés Lasa - Auñamendi Encyclopedia (Euskomedia Fundazioa) 

Municipalities in Navarre